Saphalam is a 2003 Indian Malayalam film, directed by Asok R. Nath and produced by V. Anil Thomas. The film stars Manoj K. Jayan, Balachandra Menon, Sumithra and Umashankari in lead roles. The film had musical score by Jassie Gift and Ramesh Narayan.

Plot
This is the love story of an elderly couple, who have to undergo separation.

Cast
 
Manoj K. Jayan
Balachandra Menon 
Madhupal 
Pala Aravindan 
Sumithra 
Umashankari

Awards 
National Film Awards 2003
 National Film Award for Best Feature Film in Malayalam

Soundtrack
The music was composed by Jassie Gift and Ramesh Narayan. This was Jassie Gift's first film. The song "Thoovella Thoovunnushassin", sung by Rajesh Vijay became a chartbuster. Cassettes were not released.

References

External links

2003 films
2000s Malayalam-language films
Best Malayalam Feature Film National Film Award winners